Gilbert De Smet (18 March 1936 – 10 February 1987) was a Belgian racing cyclist. He rode in four editions of the Tour de France and two of the Vuelta a España.

Throughout his career, he was often confused with Gilbert Desmet, another Belgian cyclist with a very similar name.

References

1936 births
1987 deaths
Belgian male cyclists